Joy Ride is the seventh studio album from American R&B group The Dramatics, released in 1976 via ABC Records. The album peaked at #103 on the Billboard 200 and at #11 on the Billboard R&B chart.

Three singles were released from the album: "Finger Fever", "Be My Girl" and "I Can't Get over You". "Be My Girl" was the most successful single from the album, peaking at #53 on the Billboard Hot 100.

Track listing

Chart positions

References

External links
 

1976 albums
ABC Records albums
The Dramatics albums
Albums produced by Don Davis (record producer)